Foreign relations of Serbia are accomplished by efforts of the Ministry of Foreign Affairs. Serbia has inherited the Ministry of Foreign Affairs, along with all of its holdings, after the dissolution of the previous state union with Montenegro. Serbian foreign ministries continue to serve citizens of Montenegro in countries that do not have Montenegrin diplomatic presence. The governments of Serbia and Montenegro expressed an interest in pursuing a common foreign policy. Former President of Serbia Boris Tadić referred to relations with the European Union (EU), Russia, United States and China as the four pillars of foreign policy. Serbia joined the United Nations on 1 November 2000.

History

Medieval Serbia
In the centuries prior to Ottoman rule in the country, medieval Serbian states established diplomatic relations with a number of states in Europe and the Mediterranean, particularly under the Nemanjić dynasty, during which time the Serbian Empire reached its greatest extent. Serbian envoys regularly embarked on missions to states near and far, typically in large entourages bearing gifts for the foreign courts. One such embassy to the Mamluk Sultanate of Egypt arrived in Cairo bearing gifts including five hawks, five falcons, four silver cups, and an extravagantly ornamental sword. Serbian diplomats of the time were mostly drawn from two groups; those sent to the Catholic West primarily hailed from noble families from the coastal cities of the Adriatic Sea, such as Kotor, Dubrovnik, and Bar, and those sent to the Orthodox East were frequently members of the clergy, like Saint Sava. Typically the rulers of these states would provide dwellings for the envoys and their entourages, as well as transportation.

Serbian Revolution and Autonomous Principality (1804–1878)

Serbia gained its partial independence from the Ottoman Empire in two uprisings in 1804 (led by Đorđe Petrović – Karađorđe) and 1815 (led by Miloš Obrenović), although Turkish troops continued to garrison the capital, Belgrade, until 1867. In 1817 the Principality of Serbia was granted de facto independence from the Ottoman Empire. High officials in the Austro-Hungarian Empire lobbied for Ottoman approval of the liberal 1869 constitution for Serbia, which depended on the Porte for final approval. Vienna's strategy was that  a liberal political system in Serbia would divert its impulse to foment nationalist unrest within its neighbors, and also delay its efforts to gain territory at the expense of the Ottoman Empire.

Principality/Kingdom of Serbia (1878–1918)

The Autonomous Principality became an internationally recognized independent country following the Russo-Turkish War in 1878. Serbia remained a principality or kneževina (knjaževina), until 1882 when it became a Kingdom, during which the internal politics revolved largely around dynastic rivalry between the Obrenović and Karađorđević families.

In 1885, Serbia protested against the unification of Bulgaria and Eastern Rumelia.  The Serbian king, Milan Obrenovic´ (1854–1901), who needed to divert attention away from his domestic problems, demanded that Bulgaria cede some of its territory to Serbia. The Great Powers discouraged him, but he declared war on Bulgaria on November 13, 1885. The Serbo-Bulgarian War ended on March 3, 1886. The Serbian army crossed the lightly defended northwest border of Bulgaria aiming to seize Sofia, the Bulgarian capital. The Bulgarian defenders defeated the invaders and then invaded Serbia. Vienna brokered a peace that restored the old status quo. Serbian casualties totaled 6,800, about triple the 2,300 Bulgarian total. The defeat forced Obrenovic to abdicate in March 1889, and the Serbian crown passed to a regency in the name of his son Alexander (1876–1903).

Serbian strategic goals
Serbia had multiple national goals.  Serbian intellectuals dreamed of a South Slavic state—which in the 1920s became Yugoslavia. The large number of Serbs living in Bosnia looked to Serbia as the focus of their nationalism, but they were ruled by the Germans of the Austrian Empire. Austria's annexation of Bosnia in 1908 deeply alienated the Serbian peoples. Plotters swore revenge, which they achieved in 1914 by assassination of the Austrian heir. Serbia was landlocked, and strongly felt the need for access to the Mediterranean, preferably through the Adriatic Sea. Austria worked hard to block Serbian access to the sea, for example by helping with the creation of Albania in 1912. Montenegro, Serbia's main ally, did have a small port, but Austrian territory intervened, blocking access until Serbia acquired Novi Pazar and part of Macedonia from the Ottoman Empire in 1913. To the south, Bulgaria blocked Serbian access to the Aegean Sea. Serbia, Greece, Montenegro and Bulgaria formed the Balkan League and went to war with the Ottomans in 1912–1913.  They won decisively and expelled that Empire from almost all of the Balkans.  The main remaining foe was Austria, which strongly rejected Pan-Slavism and Serbian nationalism and was ready to make war to end those threats. Ethnic nationalism would doom the multicultural Austro-Hungarian Empire. Expansion of Serbia would block Austrian and German aspirations for direct rail connections to Constantinople and the Middle East. Serbia relied primarily on Russia for Great Power support but Russia was very hesitant at first to support Pan-Slavism, and counselled caution. However, in 1914 it reversed positions and promised military support to Serbia.

World War I

The 28 June 1914 assassination of Austrian Crown Prince Franz Ferdinand in Sarajevo, by Gavrilo Princip, a pro-Serbian member of Young Bosnia served as the basis for the Austrian declaration of war on Serbia on 28 July 1914. Vienna acted despite Serbia's acceptance three days earlier of nearly all of Vienna's  demands. Vienna was convinced that Serbia was behind the plot in an effort to destabilize the multi-nation empire.  The Austro-Hungarian army invaded Serbia capturing Belgrade on 2 December 1914, however the Serbian Army successfully defended the country, won several victories, and on 15 December 1914 recaptured Belgrade.

On 28 July 1914, Austria-Hungary declared war on Serbia. Within days, long-standing mobilization plans went into effect to initiate invasions or guard against them and Russia, France and Britain stood arrayed against Austria and Germany in what at the time was called the "Great War", and was later named "World War I" or "First World War." Austria thought in terms of one small limited war involving just the two countries. It did not plan a wider war such as exploded in a matter of days.

British historian John Zametica argued that Austria-Hungary was primarily responsible for starting the war, as its leaders believed that a successful war against Serbia was the only way it could remain a Great Power, solve deep internal disputes caused by Hungarian demands, and regain influence in the Balkan states. Others, most notably Prof. Christopher Clark, have argued that Austria-Hungary, confronted with a Serbia that seemed determined to incite continual unrest and ultimately acquire all of the "Serb" inhabited lands of the Monarchy (which, according to the Pan-Serb point of view included all of Croatia, Dalmatia, Bosnia, Hercegovina and some of the southern counties of the Hungary(roughly corresponding to today's Vojvodina), and whose military and government was intertwined with the irredentist terrorist group known as "The Black Hand," saw no practical alternative to the use of force in ending what amounted to subversion from Serbia directed at a large chunk of its territories. In this perspective, Austria had little choice but to credibly threaten war and force Serbian submission if it wished to remain a Great Power.

Diplomatic relations

As of 2022, Serbia maintains diplomatic relations with 188 UN member states, the Holy See, State of Palestine and the Sovereign Military Order of Malta:

Serbia has not established diplomatic relations with Federated States of Micronesia, Kiribati, Marshall Islands, and Samoa.

Multilateral

Africa
Ever since the times of Josip Broz Tito and the Non-Aligned Movement, Serbia has enjoyed excellent relations with African nations. Angola, Ethiopia, Nigeria, Zimbabwe and South Africa are Serbia's closest allies in Sub-Saharan Africa. South Africa and Serbia have had excellent relations since the signing of diplomatic relations in 1992 following the end of the Apartheid system. Many ANC and Umkhonto we Sizwe resistance fighters received training in Serbia during Apartheid. South Africa is also home to around 20,000 Serbs, mainly living in the Johannesburg area. South Africa is also voicing support for Serbia over the Kosovo issue. Nelson Mandela was also made an honorary citizen of Belgrade. Serbia is also actively involved in many investments in Angola with whom it has excellent political and economic relations.

Relations frozen

America
Serbia has strong but strained relations with the United States and a bit more relaxed relations with Canada, because of their hostile recognition of Kosovo's independence and NATO bombing from 1999, which aimed to help this secession. On 25 February 2008, Serbian Prime Minister Vojislav Koštunica demanded that the United States rescind its recognition of Kosovo, warning that "there will be no stability until the fake state" is annulled.

Serbia has very good relations with Latin America, except Colombia and Panama, which did recognize Kosovo's independence. Brazil, the largest country in the region, decided not to recognize Kosovo's independence until an agreement with Serbia is reached.

Asia
Serbia has excellent relations with countries such as China, Indonesia, India, Iran, Iraq, Japan, Kazakhstan, Lebanon, South Korea, Vietnam, and the United Arab Emirates. These countries are important economic partners for Serbia in Asia.

Europe

Serbia has signed the Stabilisation and Association Agreement (SAA) with the European Union on 29 April 2008 and is in the process of the Republic of being admitted into the framework of the European Union as a full-fledged member state.
Serbia officially applied for European Union membership on 22 December 2009, and the European Commission recommended making it an official candidate on 12 October 2011.  After the vote of the 27 EU foreign ministers on 28 February 2012, where with 26 votes for and 1 vote against, a candidate status recommendation was issued, and Serbia received full candidate status on 1 March.  On 28 June 2013 the European Council endorsed the Council of Ministers conclusions and recommendations to open accession negotiations with Serbia. In December 2013 the Council of the European Union approved opening negotiations on Serbia's accession in January 2014, and the first Intergovernmental Conference was held on 21 January at the European Council in Brussels.

Former Yugoslavia

Other European countries

Oceania

See also

 Government of Serbia
 Ministry of Foreign Affairs
List of diplomatic missions in Serbia
List of diplomatic missions of Serbia
Visa requirements for Serbian citizens
Serbia in intergovernmental organizations
 Serbian Blue Book
 Foreign relations of Yugoslavia

References

Further reading
 Schevill, Ferdinand. History of the Balkans (1922) online
 Stavrianos, L. S.  The Balkans Since 1453 (1958), a comprehensive scholarly history
 Trivanovitch, Vaso. "Serbia, Russia, and Austria during the Rule of Milan Obrenovich, 1868-78" Journal of Modern History (1931) 3#3 pp. 414–440 online

External links

 Ministry of Foreign Affairs of Serbia

 
Politics of Serbia